Tall Timbers Plantation was a quail hunting plantation located in northern Leon County, Florida, United States established by Edward Beadel in 1895.

History
In 1826, John Phinzy of Georgia purchased Lot 4 of Section 22, Township 3 North, Range 1 East. In 1827, Samuel Bryan purchased Lot 1, Section 22 and Island 3 on Lake Iamonia within Section 22. 
In 1834, Dr. Griffin W. Holland, of Virginia purchased Lots 2 and 3 of Section 22, Township 3 North, Range 1 East naming the property Woodlawn.  Dr. Holland lived at Woodlawn for about 10 years. Holland sold the land to Alexander Mosely in 1871.

Edward Beadel was an avid sportsman from New York City and had been coming to the Piney Woods Hotel, a massive wood structure in Thomasville, Georgia for some time. The hotel was built around 1885 and attracted New Yorkers to Thomasville during the winter months. (The Piney Woods burned in 1906).

Beadel would often cross the Florida border to hunt on the property of Charlie Davis. Beadel was so impressed with Leon County that he purchased  of land along the north shore of Lake Iamonia for $8000. The property had been owned by the heirs of Eugene H. Smith and was called Hickory Hill. It consisted of land from the former Woodlawn Plantation and other land to the west. Beadel built a $3000 home where a plantation house had once stood and renamed the property Tall Timbers. The home had its own water tower, boat house, and other outbuildings.

Tall Timbers was used not only for quail hunting, but also rabbit, dove, pheasant and duck.

In 1919, Edward Beadel died and the property passed to his nephew, Henry Ludlow Beadel who had been hunting in Leon County since 1894. Field hunting was accomplished via horse-drawn carriage. For duck hunting, Henry used a handmade tin boat of between 8 and 9 feet in length. Tall Timbers also had a number of canoes. By this time, the house had a huge stone fireplace and rustic furniture fit for a lodge. The exterior had a sweeping porch facing the lake.

Adjacent plantations: In 1947 Foshalee Plantation bordered Tall Timbers on the east. In 1967, Mistletoe Plantation bordered Tall Timbers on the extreme northwest.

Henry Beadel's will left the plantation for use as a nature preserve for wildlife research.  In 1963, his cousin, also named Henry Beadel, established the Tall Timbers Research Station Foundation for land and wildlife management. On April 7, 1989,  of the property was added to the U.S. National Register of Historic Places.

See also
 Woodlawn
 Tall Timbers Research Station and Land Conservancy

References

Tall Timbers Research Center and Land Conservancy

Plantations in Leon County, Florida
1895 establishments in Florida